The 1991 Bowling Green Falcons football team was an American football team that represented Bowling Green University in the Mid-American Conference (MAC) during the 1991 NCAA Division I-A football season. In their first season under head coach Gary Blackney, the Falcons compiled an 11–1 record (8–0 against MAC opponents), won the MAC championship, defeated Fresno State in the California Bowl, and outscored all opponents by a combined total of 279 to 168.

The team's statistical leaders included Erik White with 2,204 passing yards, LeRoy Smith with 887 rushing yards, and Mark Szlachcic with 943 receiving yards.

Schedule

References

Bowling Green
Bowling Green Falcons football seasons
Mid-American Conference football champion seasons
Bowling Green Falcons football